The Dauphine Hotel is a historic hotel building located at Bonnots Mill, Osage County, Missouri.  It was built about 1840 and expanded in 1879, and is a two-story, frame and brick building with a modified "U"-plan.  The main block is six bays long and a two-story gallery spans its entire front.

It was listed on the National Register of Historic Places in 1980. It is located in the Bonnots Mill Historic District.

External links
Dauphine Hotel

References 

Individually listed contributing properties to historic districts on the National Register in Missouri
Hotel buildings on the National Register of Historic Places in Missouri
Hotel buildings completed in 1840
Hotels established in 1840
Buildings and structures in Osage County, Missouri
National Register of Historic Places in Osage County, Missouri